Foundations of Real-World Economics: What Every Economics Student Needs to Know is a 2019 book by John Komlos that argues that the turbulence of the 21st century, that includes the Dot-Com bubble, the 2008 financial crisis, the rise of right-wing populism the covid-pandemic, and numerous wars, cannot be adequately understood by conventional economics rooted in 20th-century ideas.

Book outline 
The book outlines the situation of those hurt by the economic policies by neoliberal economists. It is critical of those who advocated cutting taxes and starving the state, those who supported deregulation that culminated in the Meltdown of 2008, and those who advocated hyper-globalization that led to the rustbelt and the rise of discontent.

The text provides a look at the way the economy actually works for the typical person rather than how academics imagine it works in college classrooms. It presents an alternative perspectives on the economy; it shows that the homo-ocoenomicus rational-agent model does not work in the real world. It shows that oligopolies are a much better description of today’s multinational mega-corporations than the perfectly competitive framework.

The textbook demonstrates how misleading it is to apply oversimplified models to the real world.  The book features Kahneman on behavioral economics, Galbraith on the need for countervailing power, Case & Deaton on deaths of despair, Minsky on financial instability, Krugman on new trade theory, Rawls on justice, Stiglitz on the hollowing out of the middle class, Simon on bounded rationality, and Veblen on conspicuous consumption. The book advocates for a humanistic economics and for a Capitalism with a Human Face.

The book has been translated into Russian, German, Hungarian, Romanian,  and Chinese.

References 

Economics books
Textbooks